The Spirit of Mickey is a 1998 American animated direct-to-video anthology film, produced and released by Walt Disney Home Video on July 14, 1998. It features clips from The Mickey Mouse Club, The Wonderful World of Disney, and A Goofy Movie, in the introductory scene, and some of the namesake character's shorts, including The Band Concert, Lend a Paw, Mr. Mouse Takes a Trip and Steamboat Willie.

The Framing devices are centered on Mickey Mouse and his friends hosting an event at which they present some of Mickey's greatest cartoons to an audience of orphans, using stock footage from The Mickey Mouse Club, Disney's Wonderful World of Color, A Goofy Movie, and various Mickey Mouse and Donald Duck shorts. None of the shorts were shown with their original title cards, instead, the titles were shown on the corner of the screen, disappearing after a few seconds, with an exception for the final short, Steamboat Willie.

Overview

Cartoons

Voice cast
 Wayne Allwine as Mickey Mouse 
Walt Disney and Jimmy MacDonald as Mickey Mouse (via archival audio, uncredited)
 Bill Farmer as Goofy and Pluto
 Pinto Colvig as Goofy, Pluto, additional voices (via archival audio, uncredited)
 Tony Anselmo as Donald Duck
Clarence Nash as Donald Duck, additional voices (via archival audio, uncredited)
 Corey Burton as Ludwig Von Drake
 Diane Michelle as Daisy Duck
 Russi Taylor as Minnie Mouse
Marcellite Garner as Minnie Mouse, additional voices (via archival audio, uncredited)
 Jeannie Elias as Max

See also
 The Band Concert
 Lend a Paw
 Steamboat Willie
 Mr. Mouse Takes a Trip

Notes
This is the only Walt Disney/Mickey Mouse video in North America to include eleven cartoons.
This is also the fifth and final Non-Walt Disney Cartoon Classics video to be released in America around the 1990s (the others four videos are Love Tales, Mickey Loves Minnie, Sweetheart Stories, and The Best of Roger Rabbit).
Mickey's Surprise Party was edited for this release, due to the short being originally sponsored by Nabisco. All the Nabisco packaging were replaced by generic products, and all of Minnie's lines referencing the products at the end were redubbed by Minnie's then-current voice actress, Russi Taylor.
Later, in 2013 (fifteen years from right after when was the video was released), Get a Horse! was made, with using three of the shorts' audios, Mickey and the Seal, Mr. Mouse Takes a Trip, and The Worm Turns.
The part in the Steamboat Willie short where Mickey uses the Mama Pig as an instrument was edited out from the video when it was released.
The opening music for the Steamboat Willie short was tweaked a little bit, the music started by a few minutes earlier than before.
Clips from Mickey's Birthday Party and The Pointer are used at the beginning of the video.
The "Hey Mickey" song was also used on the 1996 direct-to-video release, Mickey's Greatest Hits, which also serves as the international equivalent of The Spirit of Mickey. Sound effects are also used for the song in Mickey's Greatest Hits, but are muted out in The Spirit of Mickey.
The character segment that leads directly into "Mickey's Trailer" uses footage from A Goofy Movie to create a brand new conversation between Goofy and his son Max. In this scene, while Max retains his teenage look from A Goofy Movie, his voice is provided not by his normal actor Jason Marsden but instead by actress Jeanie Elias, whose voice used for Max is one that makes him sound much younger than Marsden's Max voice, as though this scene (and the whole video presentation itself) was meant to take place chronologically before A Goofy Movie, following Max's final appearance in Goof Troop

External links 
 
 

1998 direct-to-video films
1998 films
Mickey Mouse films
Short film compilations
Disney direct-to-video animated films
1990s American animated films
1990s English-language films